Jean Corbeil,  (January 7, 1934 – June 25, 2002) was a Canadian politician.

Born in Montreal, Quebec, he was mayor of the city of Anjou from 1973 to 1988. In 1987-1988 he served a term as chairman of the Federation of Canadian Municipalities. In the 1988 federal election, he was elected to the House of Commons of Canada as a Progressive Conservative in the riding of Anjou—Rivière-des-Prairies.

He served in the Cabinets of Prime Ministers Brian Mulroney and Kim Campbell as Minister of Labour from 1989 to 1991, Minister of State (Transport) from 1990 to 1991, and Minister of Transport from 1991 to 1993. He was defeated in the 1993 and 1997 elections.

Electoral record (partial)

References
 

1934 births
2002 deaths
Canadian Ministers of Transport
Mayors of places in Quebec
Members of the House of Commons of Canada from Quebec
Members of the King's Privy Council for Canada
Members of the 24th Canadian Ministry
Members of the 25th Canadian Ministry
People from Anjou, Quebec
Politicians from Montreal
Progressive Conservative Party of Canada MPs